Pittsville is an unincorporated community located within Rockland Township, Venango County, Pennsylvania.

References

Unincorporated communities in Venango County, Pennsylvania
Unincorporated communities in Pennsylvania